Bosnia and Herzegovina competed at the 2013 Mediterranean Games in Mersin, Turkey from the 20th to 30 June 2013.

Medal summary

Medalists

Athletics 

Men
Track & road events

Men
Field events

Women
Track & road events

Football

Men's tournament

Team

Vedran Kjoševski
Omar Marković
Armin Hodžić
Amar Rahmanović
Fedor Predragović
Mirko Marić
Branimir Odak
Anto Petrović
Jozo Špikić
Haris Hajradinović
Emir Plakalo
Damir Sadiković
Almir Čerimagić
Renato Gojković
Adin Čiva
Almir Kasumović
Haris Muharemović
Halil Hajtić
Marin Popović

Standings

Results

References

https://web.archive.org/web/20130702231518/http://info.mersin2013.gov.tr/medals_country.aspx?n=BIH

Nations at the 2013 Mediterranean Games
2013
Mediterranean Games